Helena Chmura Kraemer is an American professor emerita of biostatistics at Stanford University. She is a fellow of the American Statistical Association.

Education 
Helena Chmura Kraemer completed a Bachelor of Arts in mathematics with Phi Beta Kappa honors from Smith College in 1957. In 1958, Kraemer attended University of Manchester as a Fulbright fellow. Kraemer earned a Doctor of Philosophy in statistics from Stanford University in 1963. Her dissertation was titled Point Estimation in Learning Models. Her doctoral advisor was Patrick Suppes.

Career 
Kraemer is a professor emerita of biostatistics in the Department of Psychiatry and Behavioral Sciences at Stanford University.

Awards and honors 
Kraemer became a fellow of the American Statistical Association in 1987. She is a member of the American College of Neuropsychopharmacology (1994) and the Institute of Medicine of the National Academies (2003). She was awarded the Franklin Ebaugh Prize from Stanford University and the Harvard Prize in Psychiatric Biostatistics and Epidemiology (2001). In 2014, she was awarded an honorary degree from Wesleyan University.

Selected works

Books

References 

Living people
20th-century American scientists
20th-century American women scientists
21st-century American scientists
21st-century American women scientists
Place of birth missing (living people)
Stanford University alumni
Stanford University School of Medicine faculty
Smith College alumni
American women mathematicians
Women statisticians
20th-century American mathematicians
21st-century American mathematicians
Biostatisticians
Fellows of the American Statistical Association
20th-century women mathematicians
21st-century women mathematicians
Year of birth missing (living people)
American statisticians
Members of the National Academy of Medicine